Kriegbach is a river of Baden-Württemberg, Germany. It branches off the Kraichbach near Ubstadt-Weiher, and flows into the Rhine in Altlußheim.

See also
List of rivers of Baden-Württemberg

References

Rivers of Baden-Württemberg
Rivers of Germany